Bargłówka refers to the following places in Poland:

 Bargłówka, Podlaskie Voivodeship
 Bargłówka, Silesian Voivodeship